Curly Top is a 1935 American musical romantic comedy film starring Shirley Temple, John Boles and Rochelle Hudson.

Plot
A bachelor wants to adopt an orphan, but she refuses to leave behind her older sister, so he adopts them both. The man eventually falls in love with the latter.

Cast
 Shirley Temple as Elizabeth Blair
 John Boles as Edward Morgan
 Rochelle Hudson as Mary Blair
 Jane Darwell as Mrs. Denham
 Rafaela Ottiano as Mrs. Higgins
 Esther Dale as Aunt Genevieve Graham
 Etienne Girardot as Mr. Wyckoff
 Arthur Treacher as Butler
 Maurice Murphy as Jimmie Rogers

Reception
Helen Brown Norden wrote in Vanity Fair that Temple "has great charm and a phenomenal ease which permit her to dominate even such an absurd situation and stupid dialogue as are forced on her in her latest picture, Curly Top. Maclean's critic Ann Ross was of the opinion that "Admirers of the screen's first child wonder will dote on 'Curly Top.' People who find that all child performances on the screen, even Temple performances, stir up the wicked old Herod in them, had better stay away.

References

External links
 
 
 
 Curly Top in the American Film Institute catalog

1930s American films
American musical films
American romantic comedy films
Films about orphans
Films directed by Irving Cummings